Adatepe is a Turkish word that may refer to:

People
 Ertan Adatepe, a top scorer in Turkish football in the mid-1960s
 Ülkü Adatepe, the youngest adopted daughter of Mustafa Kemal Atatürk, the founder of Turkey

Places
 Adatepe (volcano), an extinct volcano in southeast Bulgaria
 Adatepe, Ayvacık, a populated place in Çanakkale Province, Turkey
 Adatepe Dam, a dam in Kahramanmaraş Province, Turkey
 Adatepe, Devrek, a village in Zonguldak Province, Turkey
 Adatepe, Lapseki, a populated place in Çanakkale Province, Turkey
 Adatepe, Vezirköprü, a village in Samsun Province, Turkey

Ships
 Adatepe-class destroyer, two former destroyers of the Turkish Navy
 TCG Adatepe (D 353), a Gearing-class former destroyer of the Turkish Navy